Cosmorama may refer to:

Cosmorama, São Paulo, a municipality in the state of São Paulo in Brazil.
Cosmorama, a perspective picture of the landmarks of the world.
Cosmorama an entertainment in 19th century London involving cosmorama images.
Kosmorama is the name of Trondheim International Film Festival in Norway.